The 1963–64 Copa del Generalísimo was the 62nd staging of the Spanish Cup. The competition began on 27 October 1963 and ended on 5 July 1964 with the final.

First round

|}
Tiebreaker

|}

Round of 32

|}
Tiebreaker

|}

Round of 16

|}

Quarter-finals

|}
Tiebreaker

|}

Semi-finals

|}

Final

|}

External links
 rsssf.com
 linguasport.com

Copa del Rey seasons
Copa del Rey
Copa